Murray Bartlett (born 20 March 1971) is an Australian actor. He is best known for his roles as Dom Basaluzzo in the HBO comedy-drama series Looking (2014–2015), Mouse Tolliver in the Netflix revival of Tales of the City (2019), Armond in the first season of the HBO dark comedy series The White Lotus (2021), Vinnie Green in the Apple TV+ series Physical (2022), Nick De Noia in the Hulu miniseries Welcome to Chippendales (2022), and Frank in the episode "Long, Long Time" of the HBO post-apocalyptic drama series The Last of Us (2023). For his role in The White Lotus, he won the Primetime Emmy Award for Outstanding Supporting Actor in a Limited or Anthology Series or Movie.

Early life
Bartlett was born in Sydney on 20 March 1971. When he was four years old, he moved with his family to Perth. He attended John Curtin College of the Arts in Fremantle, where he graduated from the drama program in 1988. Upon graduating, he was admitted to the National Institute of Dramatic Art in Sydney.

Career
Bartlett pursued an acting career in Australia for several years, including a role in the series headLand. In 1993, he played con man Luke Foster in Neighbours. In 2000, he relocated to the U.S. His first big break there came a few years later when he was cast as a guest star in the HBO series Sex and the City. He also played D.K., John Crichton's best friend, in four episodes of the SciFi Channel series Farscape. In 2006, he joined Hugh Jackman in the Australian touring company production of Jackman's Broadway hit The Boy From Oz.

From March 2007 until the show's cancellation in September 2009, Bartlett was a cast member on the CBS daytime soap opera Guiding Light, where he played Cyrus Foley. He starred as Dominic "Dom" Basaluzzo in the HBO comedy-drama series Looking from 2014 to 2015, and then reprised his role in the series finale television film, Looking: The Movie in 2016. In 2017, he portrayed a recurring role in the musical drama series Nashville. Bartlett assumed the central role of Michael 'Mouse' Tolliver in the Netflix revival of Tales of the City.

In 2021, Bartlett starred in The White Lotus as Armond, the luxury resort manager and a recovering drug addict who has been "clean" for 5 years. Bartlett got the role through a self tape audition. For his portrayal, Bartlett received nominations at the Screen Actors Guild Awards and Independent Spirit Awards and won at the AACTA Awards, Critics' Choice Television Awards, and Primetime Emmy Awards.

In 2023, Bartlett appeared in the HBO post-apocalyptic drama series The Last of Us, portraying Frank in the episode "Long, Long Time". At the time of its airing, the episode received universal acclaim and was widely considered to be the best of the show's first season.

Personal life
Bartlett came out as gay early in his career. When asked about the decision in a 2021 interview, he stated, "I didn't feel like I really had an alternative. I just never felt I could ever be anything but myself." He lives with his partner Matt in Provincetown, Massachusetts.

Filmography

Film

Television

Awards and nominations

References

External links

1971 births
AACTA Award winners
Australian expatriates in the United States
Australian expatriate male actors in the United States
Australian gay actors
Australian male musical theatre actors
Australian male soap opera actors
Living people
Outstanding Performance by a Supporting Actor in a Miniseries or Movie Primetime Emmy Award winners
Male actors from Perth, Western Australia